Americoliva is a genus of sea snails in the family Olividae, the olives. It is sometimes considered a subgenus of Oliva. It is a sympatric genus of Vullietoliva.

Description 
Members of Americoliva have long, well-developed hairline flammules on their filament channels.

Species 
Americoliva contains the following species:

 Americoliva bollingi (Clench, 1934): synonym of Americoliva nivosa bollingi (Clench, 1934): synonym of Oliva nivosa bollingi Clench, 1934
 † Americoliva carolinensis (Conrad, 1862)
 Americoliva circinata (Marrat, 1871): synonym of Oliva circinata Marrat, 1871
 Americoliva deynzerae (Petuch & Sargent, 1986): synonym of Oliva deynzerae Petuch & Sargent, 1986
 † Americoliva edwardsi (Olsson, 1967) 
 Americoliva grovesi Petuch & R.F. Myers, 2014: synonym of Oliva grovesi (Petuch & R. F. Meyers, 2014) (original combination)
 Americoliva harpularia (Lamarck, 1811): synonym of Oliva harpularia Lamarck, 1811
 Americoliva matchetti Petuch & R. F. Myers, 2014: synonym of Oliva matchetti (Petuch & R. F. Meyers, 2014) (original combination)
 Americoliva mcleani Petuch & R.F. Myers, 2014: synonym of Oliva mcleani (Petuch & R. F. Meyers, 2014) (original combination)
 Americoliva mooreana (Petuch, 2013): synonym of Oliva mooreana Petuch, 2013
 Americoliva murielae (Olsson, 1967) † : synonym of Americoliva nivosa murielae (Olsson, 1967) †
 Americoliva nivosa (Marrat, 1871): synonym of Oliva nivosa Marrat, 1871
 Americoliva polpasta (Duclos, 1833): synonym of Oliva polpasta Duclos, 1833
 Americoliva recourti Petuch & R. F. Myers, 2014: synonym of Oliva recourti (Petuch & R. F. Meyers, 2014) (original combination)
 Americoliva reticularis (Lamarck, 1811): synonym of Oliva reticularis Lamarck, 1811
 Americoliva sayana (Ravenel, 1834): synonym of Oliva sayana Ravenel, 1834
 Americoliva sunderlandi (Petuch, 1987): synonym of Oliva sunderlandi Petuch, 1987

References

 Petuch & Berschauer (2019), A Review of the Carolinean Province Americoliva nivosa Complex (Gastropoda: Olividae) with the Description of a New Subspecies; The Festivus 51 (4), 2019

 http://olivirv.myspecies.info/en/taxon-pages/americoliva-carolinensis

Olividae